The Estonian Chess Championship is played to determine the Estonian champion in chess.

The first unofficial championship in Estonia was held in 1903 and was organized by a chess club from Tallinn (then Reval, Russian Empire). After World War I, Estonia became independent. In 1923, the first official Estonian championship was held in Tallinn and has since been organized on an annual basis. In 1945, the first women's championship was held.

Unofficial Championships

{| class="sortable wikitable"
! Year !! City !! Champion
|-
| 1903||Reval||W. Sohn
|-
| 1904||Reval||Bernhard Gregory
|-
| 1905||Reval||Aaron Feinstein
|-
|1906||Reval||Abels
|-
|1909||Reval||Khmelevsky
|-
|1910||Reval||Aaron Feinstein
|}

Official Championships

{| class="sortable wikitable"
! # !! Year !! Host City !! Men's Champion !! Women's Champion
|- 
| 1||1923||Tallinn||Paul Rinne||rowspan=14|
|-
| 2||1925||Tallinn||Johannes Türn		
|-
| 3||1930||Tallinn||Vladas Mikėnas	
|-
| 4||1932||Tallinn||Leho Laurine	
|-
| 5||1933||Tallinn||Gunnar Friedemann	
|-
| 6||1934||Tallinn||Ilmar Raud		
|-
| 7||1935||Tallinn||Paul Keres		
|-
| 8||1936||Tallinn||Paul Felix Schmidt	
|-
| 9||1937||Tallinn||Paul Felix Schmidt	
|-
| 10||1939||Tallinn||Ilmar Raud		
|-
| 11||1941||Tallinn||Johannes Türn		
|-
| 12||1942||Tallinn||Paul Keres		
|-
| 13||1943||Tallinn||Paul Keres			
|-
| 14||1944||Viljandi||Johannes Türn and August Eller
|-
| 15||1945||Tallinn||Paul Keres||Salme Rootare
|-
| 16||1946||Tallinn||Raul Renter||rowspan=2|
|-
| 17||1947||Tallinn||Jüri Randviir     
|-
| 18||1948||Tallinn||Aleksander Arulaid||Salme Rootare	     
|-
| 19||1949||Pärnu||Jüri Randviir and Raul Renter||Salme Rootare	
|-
| 20||1950||Tallinn||Jüri Randviir||Salme Rootare	
|-
| 21||1951||Tallinn||Iivo Nei||Helju Roosa	               
|-
| 22||1952||Tartu||Iivo Nei||Marie Orav	             
|-
| 23||1953||Tartu||Paul Keres||Urve Kure	            
|-
| 24||1954||Tallinn||Jüri Randviir||Salme Rootare          
|-
| 25||1955||Tallinn||Aleksander Arulaid||Aino Kukk     
|-
| 26||1956||Tartu||Iivo Nei||Salme Rootare	              
|-
| 27||1957||Tartu||Kalju Pitksaar||Salme Rootare            
|-
| 28||1958||Tallinn||Gunnar Uusi||Urve Kure	            
|-
| 29||1959||Tartu||Gunnar Uusi||Marie Orav 	
|-
| 30||1960||Viljandi||Iivo Nei||Salme Rootare   
|-
| 31||1961||Tallinn||Iivo Nei||Maaja Ranniku
|-
| 32||1962||Tartu||Iivo Nei||Salme Rootare              
|-
| 33||1963||Tallinn||Gunnar Uusi||Maaja Ranniku           
|-
| 34||1964||Tallinn||Aleksander Arulaid||Salme Rootare              
|-
| 35||1965||Tartu||Rein Etruk||Urve Kure             
|-
| 36||1966||Viljandi||Gunnar Uusi||Salme Rootare           
|-
| 37||1967||Tallinn||Helmuth Luik||Maaja Ranniku           
|-
| 38||1968||Tartu||Aarne Hermlin||Mari Kinsigo (off contest)          
|-
| 39||1969||Tallinn||Rein Etruk||Salme Rootare           
|-
| 40||1970||Tartu||Hillar Kärner||Salme Rootare
|-
| 41||1971||Tallinn||Iivo Nei||Salme Rootare             
|-
| 42||1972||Tartu||Andres Vooremaa||Salme Rootare        
|-
| 43||1973||Tallinn||Andres Vooremaa and Rein Etruk||Maaja Ranniku         
|-
| 44||1974||Tartu||Iivo Nei||Mari Kinsigo (off contest)            
|-
| 45||1975||Pärnu||Hillar Kärner||Leili Pärnpuu       
|-
| 46||1976||Haapsalu||Valter Heuer||Mari Kinsigo (off contest)         
|-
| 47||1977||Viljandi||Hillar Kärner||Tatjana Fomina        
|-
| 48||1978||Tallinn||Boris Rõtov||Tatjana Fomina          
|-
| 49||1979||Tartu||Gunnar Uusi||Leili Pärnpuu          
|-
| 50||1980||Tallinn||Gunnar Uusi||Leili Pärnpuu          
|-
| 51||1981||Haapsalu||Jaan Ludolf||Maaja Ranniku           
|-
| 52||1982||Tallinn||Lembit Oll||Maaja Ranniku            
|-
| 53||1983||Pärnu||Aleksander Veingold and Hillar Kärner||Tatjana Fomina    
|-
| 54||1984||Tallinn||Hillar Kärner||Maaja Ranniku       
|-
| 55||1985||Tallinn||Hillar Kärner||Svetlana Zainetdinova 
|-
| 56||1986||Tartu||Jaan Ehlvest||Leili Pärnpuu          
|-
| 57||1987||Haapsalu||Hillar Kärner||Maaja Ranniku
|-
| 58||1988||Tallinn||Kalle Kiik||Maaja Ranniku           
|-
| 59||1989||Tallinn||Olav Sepp||Tatjana Fomina            
|-
| 60||1990||Tallinn||Mati Nei||Leili Pärnpuu            
|-
| 61||1991||Tallinn||Olav Sepp||Maaja Ranniku           
|-
| 62||1992||Tallinn||Olav Sepp||Tatjana Fomina           
|-
| 63||1993||Tallinn||Olav Sepp||Tuulikki Laesson            
|-
| 64||1994||Tallinn||Olav Sepp||Monika Tsõganova              
|-
| 65||1995||Tallinn||Olav Sepp||Monika Tsõganova
|-
| 66||1996||Tallinn||Sergei Zjukin||Tuulikki Laesson
|-
| 67||1997||Tallinn||Roman Sergejev||Monika Tsõganova
|-
| 68||1998||Tallinn||Tarvo Seeman||Tatjana Fomina
|-
| 69||1999||Tallinn||Kaido Külaots||Monika Tsõganova
|-
| 70||2000||Tallinn||Mihhail Rõtšagov||Viktoria Baškite (off contest)      
|-
| 71||2001||Pühajärve||Kaido Külaots||Monika Tsõganova
|-
| 72||2002||Kilingi-Nõmme||Kaido Külaots||Tatjana Fomina 
|-
| 73||2003||Tallinn||Kaido Külaots||Tatjana Fomina         
|-
| 74||2004||Tallinn||Meelis Kanep||Monika Tsõganova 
|-
| 75||2005||Tallinn||Meelis Kanep||Monika Tsõganova
|-
| 76||2006||Tallinn||Tarvo Seeman||Valeriya Gansvind
|-
| 77||2007||Tallinn||Meelis Kanep||Monika Tsõganova
|-
| 78||2008||Tallinn||Kaido Külaots||Monika Tsõganova
|-
| 79||2009||Rakvere||Kaido Külaots||Valeriya Gansvind
|-
| 80||2010||Tartu||Kaido Külaots||Tuuli Vahtra
|-
| 81||2011||Tallinn||Pavel Vorobjov||Regina Narva
|-
| 82||2012||Tallinn||Mark Lapidus||Tatjana Fomina
|-
| 83||2013||Tallinn||Ottomar Ladva||Tatjana Fomina
|-
| 84||2014||Tallinn||Kaido Külaots||Mai Narva
|-
| 85||2015||Tallinn||Ottomar Ladva||Margareth Olde
|-
| 86||2016||Tallinn||Ottomar Ladva||Mai Narva
|-
| 87||2017||Tallinn||Ilja Sirosh||Mai Narva
|-
| 88||2018||Tallinn||Ottomar Ladva||Margareth Olde
|-
| 89||2019||Tallinn||Aleksandr Volodin||Sofia Blokhin
|-
| 90||2020||Tallinn||Kaido Külaots||Mai Narva
|-
| 91||2021||Tallinn||Aleksandr Volodin||Anastassia Sinitsina
|-
| 92||2022||Tallinn||Aleksandr Volodin||Anastassia Sinitsina
|}

Multiple Champions

Men's Champions
{| class="sortable wikitable"
! # !! Men's Champions !! Titles !! Years
|- 
|1||Kaido Külaots||9||1999, 2001, 2002, 2003, 2008, 2009, 2010, 2014, 2020
|- 
|2||Iivo Nei||8||1951, 1952, 1956, 1960, 1961, 1962, 1971, 1974
|- 
|3||Hillar Kärner||7||1970, 1975, 1977, 1983, 1984, 1985, 1987
|- 
|rowspan=2|4||Gunnar Uusi||6||1958, 1959, 1963, 1966, 1979, 1980
|- 
|Olav Sepp||6||1989, 1991, 1992, 1993, 1994, 1995
|- 
|6||Paul Keres||5||1935, 1942, 1943, 1945, 1953
|- 
|rowspan=2|7||Jüri Randviir||4||1947, 1949, 1950, 1954
|-
|Ottomar Ladva||4||2013, 2015, 2016, 2018
|-
|rowspan=5|9||Johannes Türn||3||1925, 1941, 1944
|- 
|Aleksander Arulaid||3||1948, 1955, 1964
|- 
|Rein Etruk||3||1965, 1969, 1973
|- 
|Meelis Kanep||3||2004, 2005, 2007
|- 
|Aleksandr Volodin||3||2019, 2021, 2022
|- 
|rowspan=5|13||Ilmar Raud||2||1934, 1939
|- 
|Paul Felix Schmidt||2||1936, 1937
|- 
|Raul Renter||2||1946, 1949
|- 
|Andres Vooremaa||2||1972, 1973
|- 
|Tarvo Seeman||2||1998, 2006
|}

Women's Champions
{| class="sortable wikitable"
! # !! Women's Champions!! Titles !! Years
|- 
| 1||Salme Rootare||15||1945, 1948, 1949, 1950, 1954, 1956, 1957, 1960, 1962, 1964, 1966, 1969, 1970, 1971, 1972
|- 
|rowspan=2|2||Maaja Ranniku||10||1961, 1963, 1967, 1973, 1981, 1982, 1984, 1987, 1988, 1991
|- 
|Tatjana Fomina||10||1977, 1978, 1983, 1989, 1992, 1998, 2002, 2003, 2012, 2013
|- 
| 4||Monika Tsõganova||9||1994, 1995, 1997, 1999, 2001, 2004, 2005, 2007, 2008
|- 
| 5||Leili Pärnpuu||5||1975, 1979, 1980, 1986, 1990
|- 
| 6||Mai Narva||4||2014, 2016, 2017, 2020
|- 
|rowspan=2|7||Urve Kure||3||1953, 1958, 1965
|- 
|Mari Kinsigo||3||1968, 1974, 1976
|-
|rowspan=5|8||Margareth Olde||2||2015, 2018
|-
|Marie Orav||2||1952, 1959
|- 
|Tuulikki Laesson||2||1993, 1996
|- 
|Valeriya Gansvind||2||2006, 2009
|- 
|Anastassia Sinitsina||2||2021, 2022
|}

References
 (establishment and results from 1905 through 1910)
https://web.archive.org/web/20120118064310/http://vabaettur.ee/main/results/meistrid.htm
https://web.archive.org/web/20070611070649/http://www.maleliit.ee/modules.php?print=1&name=Arhiiv&a=23&klass=1&id=1
Paul Keres
RUSBASE (part V) 1919-1937,1991-1994
RUSBASE (part IV) 1938-1960
RUSBASE (part III), 1961-1969,1985-1990
RUSBASE (part II) 1970-1984

External links
 Official website

Chess national championships
Women's chess national championships
Championship
1903 in chess
Recurring events established in 1903
Chess
1903 establishments in the Russian Empire
1923 establishments in Estonia